Dallas High School is a public high school located in Dallas, Pennsylvania, United States. In 2016, enrollment was reported as 888 pupils in 9th through 12th grades. The school employed 58 teachers. Dallas High School is the sole high school operated by the Dallas School District.

Dallas High School students may choose to attend the West Side Area Vocational Technical School for training in the construction and mechanical trades. The Luzerne Intermediate Unit IU18 provides Dallas High School with a wide variety of services like: specialized education for disabled students; state mandated training on recognizing and reporting child abuse; speech and visual disability services; criminal background check processing for prospective employees and professional development for staff and faculty.

Extracurriculars
The Dallas School District offers a wide variety of clubs, activities and an extensive, publicly funded sports program.

Athletics
The district funds:
Varsity

Boys
 Baseball - AAAA
 Basketball- AAAAA
 Cross country - AA
 Football - AAAA
 Golf - AAA
 Indoor track and field - AAAA
 Lacrosse - AA
 Soccer - AAA
 Swimming and diving - AAA
 Tennis - AA
 Track and field - AAA
 Volleyball - AA
 Wrestling - AAA

Girls
 Basketball - AAAA
 Cheerleading - AAAAA
 Cross country - AA
 Field hockey - AA
 Golf - AA
 Lacrosse - AA
 Soccer (Fall) - AAA
 Softball - AAAA
 Swimming and diving - AA
 Tennis - AA
 Track and field - AAA
 Volleyball - AAA

According to PIAA directory July 2016

Dallas High School has won PIAA State Championships in football (1993), girls' cross country (2003, 2005, 2014), boys cross country (2015, 2016), girls' soccer (2007), and men's diving (2005, 2006). Dallas also has won many District 2 and Wyoming Valley Conference titles. A lacrosse team was also adopted for the 2009 season.

Scandals
In 2010, Dallas High School was the subject of a report by the Pennsylvania Auditor General. The report found that a former guidance counselor, John Wolensky, had misappropriated more than fifty thousand dollars in school funds. The Auditor General lays blame at the feet of superintendent Frank Galicki for lack of proper oversight. 

In 2012, man, a special education teacher at Dallas Middle School, resigned after he was found to have taken lewd photographs of special education students. Shuga was subsequently charged with invasion of privacy.

Notable alumni 
 Greg Manusky, former American football player and current defensive coordinator for the Indianapolis Colts of the National Football League
 Lisa Baker, Pennsylvania State Senator (R-Luzerne).

References

External links 
 Dallas High School website

Public high schools in Pennsylvania
Educational institutions established in 1961
Schools in Luzerne County, Pennsylvania
1961 establishments in Pennsylvania